The Nissitissit River is a  river in southern New Hampshire and northern Massachusetts in the United States.  It is a tributary of the Nashua River, itself a tributary of the Merrimack River, which flows to the Gulf of Maine. This river is part of the Nashua River Watershed.

The Nissitissit River begins at the outlet of Potanipo Pond in the town of Brookline, New Hampshire.  It flows southeast at a very mild gradient, crossing the southwest corner of Hollis, New Hampshire, before entering Massachusetts, where it joins the Nashua River in the town of Pepperell.

See also

List of rivers of Massachusetts
List of rivers of New Hampshire

References

Tributaries of the Merrimack River
Rivers of New Hampshire
Rivers of Middlesex County, Massachusetts
Rivers of Massachusetts
Rivers of Hillsborough County, New Hampshire
Maine placenames of Native American origin
New Hampshire placenames of Native American origin
Wild and Scenic Rivers of the United States